The Brazilian national ice hockey team is the national men's ice hockey team of Brazil. The team is controlled by the Brazilian Ice Sports Federation and as an associate member of the International Ice Hockey Federation (IIHF). Brazil is currently not ranked in the IIHF World Ranking and has still not actively competing in any World Championship, but have played in the Pan American Tournament, a regional tournament for lower-tier hockey nations in the Americas.

History

Ice hockey in Brazil
Brazil joined the IIHF on 26 June 1984. It was the first South American nation to join the IIHF until Argentina joined in 1998 and Chile in 2000. Brazil has still not actively competing in any World Championship in ice hockey, except in inline hockey. There are a number of rinks around the country. The teams that competed for the 2009–10 National Championship are Sociedade Hipica Campinas, Sertãozinho, Amparo NL, Palmeiras, Darks-Guariani, Portuguesa and Capelle Hockey School. Mike Greenlay and Robyn Regehr, who both played in the NHL, were born in Brazil.

Participation in IIHF competitions
Brazil participated in the 2014 Pan American Ice Hockey Tournament. They played their first international game against the host nation, Mexico, which they lost 16–0. In the following game, Brazil recorded its first international goal in a 5–3 defeat to Argentina.

In the 2015 edition, Brazil recorded its first win in its first game in the tournament, 5–2, against a junior Mexico team.

After beating Argentina “B” (7–0) and losing to Colombia (3–0) and Mexico (11–1), Brazil won its last game by 6–1 against Argentina's main team on 7 June, and reached third place in standings, thus winning the bronze medal, its first in the tournament.

International competitions

Pan American Tournament

Roster
Last roster update: 6 November 2018

Head coach:  Jens Hinderlie

All-time record against other nations
Last match update: 11 June 2017

References

External links
International Ice Hockey Federation
National Teams of Ice Hockey

National
National ice hockey teams in the Americas
Ice hockey